Ivo de Morville (died c. 1237), Lord of Knighton, Bradpole and Wraxall, was an English noble.

He was the eldest son of William de Morville.

Marriage and issue
Ivo married, Isabella, of unknown parentage and had the following known issue:
Matilda de Morville, married Matthew de Columbariis, had issue.
Elena de Morville, married to Ralph de Gorges, had issue.

He also fathered an illegitimate daughter, Christina who married Ralph de Karcia.

References
Parishes: Newchurch, in A History of the County of Hampshire: Volume 5, ed. William Page (London, 1912).

12th-century English people
13th-century English people
1237 deaths